A panel PC is a personal computer built into a flat-screen display so that the entire computer can be mounted in any manner available for mounting a display alone. It eliminates the need for a separate space for the computer. A panel PC is typically ruggedized for used in industrial or high-traffic settings. It may include any of the ports and wireless communication capabilities found in other computers.

See also 
 Industrial PC
 Industry 4.0
 Embedded system
 Rugged computer

Classes of computers
Industrial computing
Personal computers